Stansted Mountfitchet is an English village and civil parish in Uttlesford district, Essex, near the Hertfordshire border,  north of London. According to the 2001 census it had a population of 5,533, increasing to 6,011 at the 2011 census. By the 2021 census it had increased to 8621.  The village is served by Stansted Mountfitchet railway station.

Stansted Mountfitchet is situated in north-west Essex near the Hertfordshire border and 3 miles (5 km) north of Bishop's Stortford. The village has three primary schools (Bentfield Primary School, St Mary's (C of E) Primary School and Magna Carta Primary Academy) and one high school which was renamed the Forest Hall School in September, 2013.

History
Stansted was a Saxon settlement (the name means 'stony place' in Anglo-Saxon) that predates the Norman conquest. In the 1086 Domesday Book, Stansted was in the ancient hundred of Uttlesford. It was one of many villages and manors controlled by the powerful Robert Gernon de Montfichet (from Montfiquet in Calvados, Normandy), so began to be referred to as Stansted Mountfitchet to differentiate it from similarly named places. A small remnant of his castle remains, around which a reconstruction of an early Norman castle has been built. Believed to have been fortified originally in the Iron Age, and subsequently by the Romans and Vikings, construction of the Norman castle began in 1066. Lord Mountfitchet is also considered the 11th century builder of Montfichet's Tower in London.

St Mary the Virgin's Church, built in the 1120s, is a redundant church under the care of the Churches Conservation Trust. The brick west tower was added in 1692. A chapel of ease dedicated to Saint John the Evangelist was built in 1889 nearer the centre of the village and is now the village church. Stansted Hall was built in 1871.

Landmarks

Other village attractions include the House on the Hill Toy Museum, which its owners claim "is the largest toy museum in the World". Located next to Mountfitchet Castle and Norman Village of 1066, both attractions are owned by Alan Goldsmith. The museum opened in 1991 and holds over 80,000 toys, mostly from the 1950s to the 1990s. A working windmill built in 1787 is in the village, and is open to the public once a month.

During the Second World War, the US Air Force constructed an airfield near the village. After the war ended, it was subsequently taken over by the government and developed as a commercial airport. Today, London Stansted Airport is accessible by road from Junction 8 of the M11 motorway, near Bishop's Stortford and direct by train from London Liverpool Street.

Economy
In March 2013, Stansted Mountfitchet was named as the UK's fourth most internet-friendly town. The Google eTown Awards recognise the top places where businesses are most actively embracing the web and Stansted's high ranking reflects the increased use of the internet to spur economic growth. The results put Stansted in fourth place behind Richmond, in third, Edinburgh, in second, and Stratford upon Avon, which took the top spot.

Titan Airways has its head office in Enterprise House on the property of Stansted Airport. Several defunct airlines had their head offices on the Stansted property. AirUK (later KLM uk) had its head office in Stansted House. Buzz had its head office in Endeavour House. AB Airlines had its head office in Enterprise House. Lloyd International Airways had its head office at Lloyd House. Go Fly had its head office at Enterprise House.

Until it merged with Lastminute.com in 2006, Travelocity.co.uk had its headquarters in Stansted Mountfitchet and employed around 60 Essex and Hertfordshire locals. The office closed in the early part of 2006 and Travelocity.co.uk formally came under the umbrella of Lastminute.com, who has offices in London and Woking, Surrey.

Sport and leisure
Non-League football club Stansted F.C. (winners of the FA Vase in 1983-84) play at the Hargrave Park sports ground in the village and there is also a cricket club based at the ground.

Notable people
 Actor James Frain was raised in Stansted Mountfitchet.
 Munroe Bergdorf, model and activist.

See also

The Hundred Parishes

References

External links

 Stansted Mountfitchet Parish Council
 The Recorders of Uttlesford History

 
Villages in Essex
Civil parishes in Essex
Uttlesford